The 2017–18 Essex Senior Football League season was the 47th in the history of Essex Senior Football League, a football competition in England.

The constitution for Step 5 and Step 6 divisions for 2017–18 was announced on 26 May 2017. The constitution for the Essex Senior League was ratified at the league's AGM on 22 June, although Ilford were expelled for missing deadlines and fines. The club were readmitted to the league on 17 July following an appeal.

League table

The league featured 20 clubs which competed in the league last season, along with one new club:
 Great Wakering Rovers, relegated from the Isthmian League

Also, London Bari merged with Middlesex County League club Hackney Wick and took their name, while Haringey & Waltham changed name to Woodford Town 2017.

League table

References

Essex Senior Football League seasons
9